The Prince of Wales Fort is a historic bastion fort on Hudson Bay across the Churchill River from Churchill, Manitoba, Canada.

History

The European history of this area starts with Henry Hudson sailing into Hudson Bay in 1610. The area was recognized as important in the fur trade and of potential importance for other discoveries. The fort is built in a star shape.

Original (wood) fort
This fort began as a log fort built in 1717 by James Knight of the Hudson's Bay Company (HBC) and was originally called the Churchill River Post. In 1719, the post was renamed Prince of Wales Fort. It was located on the west bank of the Churchill River to protect and control the HBC's interests in the fur trade.

Construction of the present stone fort
The original wooden fort was replaced by a massive stone fort, probably to abide by the Royal Charter which required that Rupert's Land should be fortified.

Construction of this fort was started in 1731 near what was then called Eskimo Point.

It had forty-two cannon mounted on the walls. There was also a battery across the river on Cape Merry meant to hold six more cannon.

In battle
In the 1780s, the French government launched a Hudson Bay expedition to damage HBC activities in that bay. Three French warships of the expedition, led by Jean-François de La Pérouse, captured the Prince of Wales Fort in 1782. The fort was manned by only 39 (non-military) men at the time, and the fort's governor, Samuel Hearne, recognised the numerical and military imbalance and surrendered without a single shot being fired. The French partially destroyed the fort, but its mostly-intact ruins survive to this day.

The fort returned to the HBC in 1783. Thereafter, its importance waned with the decline in the fur trade although the post was refounded a little way up the river.

Structures

The remains of these buildings still stand in the Fort, although none of them are intact, with roofs long since deteroriated.

 Rough Stone Dwelling House
 Governor's Quarters
 Storehouse
 Men's Quarters and Barracks
 Stonemason's Workshop
 Cooper and Carpenter Workshops
 Tailor's Room
 Blacksmith Shop

The courtyard is intact and all other exposed areas covered by grass.

Cape Merry Battery
Opposite the fort across the mouth of the Churchill River is Cape Merry Battery. The battery was named for former HBC Deputy Governor (1712-1718) Captain John Merry (1656-1729). The fixed battery was built three times. The first was built sometime after 1718 and featured a wall protected by cannon(s) and powder magazine. Only remaining parts are the ruins of the door of the magazine and parts of the wall. A second battery was built in 1747 further south and away from the river due to concerns that the first battery could be used to attack the fort. A third was rebuilt in 1959-1960 from second as a restoration process. The battery today has a single cannon.

Restoration
After the construction of the Hudson Bay Railway to Churchill was completed in 1929, railway labour and railway construction equipment was used to restore the fort. Restoration work was also performed in the late 1950s.

Archaeological investigations at and around the fort began in 1958.

Since 2005, Parks Canada archaeologists have been working in and around the fort in conjunction with a large-scale wall stabilization work and a fort interpretation program.

Legacy
In 1920, the site was designated a National Historic Site of Canada.

A series of journals written by explorer Samuel Hearne on a journey from Prince of Wales Fort in Hudson's Bay to the Northern Ocean was published by the Champlain Society in 1911. On 28 June 1985, Canada Post issued 'Fort Prince of Wales, Man.', one of the 20 stamps in the "Forts Across Canada Series". The fort is also the subject of one of the National Film Board of Canada's Canada Vignettes.

See also
 John Bean, explorer who voyaged to the fort
 Nathaniel Bishop, master of the fort

References

External links 

 Manitoba Historical Society
 Prince of Wales Fort National Historic Site of Canada
 YouTube video of the NFB vignette.

Buildings and structures in Churchill, Manitoba
Forts or trading posts on the National Historic Sites of Canada register
Hudson's Bay Company forts
National Historic Sites in Manitoba
Forts in Manitoba
Fur trade National Historic Sites of Canada
1717 establishments in the British Empire
1717 establishments in North America